Quillayute Airport , formerly known as Quillayute State Airport, is a public airport located approximately  west of the city of Forks, in Clallam County, Washington, United States. It is owned by the City of Forks. This former Naval Auxiliary Air Station was deeded to the City of Forks by the Washington State Department of Transportation in 1999.

Facilities and aircraft
For the 12-month period ending December 31, 2006, the airport had 6,700 aircraft operations: 97% general aviation and 3% military.

Runway 12/30 is closed (the north-south runway). In the Master Planning effort currently underway, it is the intent, in the long-term plan, to remove the displacement on runway 4/22 in the future, and reopen runway 12/30 at a shortened length.

Climate 
Quillayute has a maritime west coast climate. The warmest month is August and the coldest month is December.

References

External links 
 Quillayute Airport at City of Forks website

Airports in Washington (state)
Airfields of the United States Navy
Transportation buildings and structures in Clallam County, Washington
Closed installations of the United States Navy